Plumbers Don't Wear Ties is an adult-oriented "romantic comedy" visual novel/dating sim developed by United Pixtures and published by Kirin Entertainment for the 3DO Interactive Multiplayer. Although the game did have a Microsoft Windows version, it had very limited distribution and was published by United Pixtures itself. The game stars Edward J. Foster and Jeanne Basone as John and Jane, respectively; two people who are being pressured by their respective parents to go out and find a spouse. The player's task is to get John and Jane together.

Plumbers Don't Wear Ties received overwhelmingly negative reviews from critics for its lackluster production value, nonsensical storyline, poor acting and humor, and for primarily being presented as a slideshow despite being advertised as a full motion video game. The game is considered one of the worst video games of all time.

At E3 2021, a re-release of the game for Microsoft Windows, Nintendo Switch, PlayStation 4, and PlayStation 5 was announced by Limited Run Games.

Gameplay

The only interaction is where the player gets to choose the storyline (two to three choices at a time) in a DVD menu-style manner, although there are only one to two right choices. The player will use the D-pad (or mouse in the PC version) to make a choice and then will press the A button to see what will happen for choosing that option. At certain points in the game, the player has the opportunity to choose what actions John or Jane will do; making the right choices will bring the characters together while making the wrong choices will result in commentary from the game's two narrators, who sometimes fight with each other. If enough bad choices are made, the player is given the choice to restart the game or try to make the right choice.

Plot
A full motion video clip features the character Jane introducing the player to the main objective and basic rules of the game. From that point onwards the entire format is that of still photographs with actors reading the dialogue. The narrator also changes once during the game, before being changed back to the original a few scenes later.

In the early 1990s, Los Angeles locals John (Edward J. Foster) and Jane (Jeanne Basone), are both being pressured by their respective parents to find a suitable spouse. John, a plumber, is told by his mother (Violetta Gevorkian, voiced by Samantha Eggersoll) to go to her house with the girl she had set a date up with, Amy, for dinner at 6:00 pm. College student Jane, meanwhile, who is considered a "daddy's girl", is going to a job interview, having disliked her coworkers at her previous job.

John and Jane both meet in a parking lot by 8:00 AM and John instantly falls in love with Jane, calling her "perfect". John decides not to go to work and stays in the parking lot to wait for Jane to leave from her job interview so he can meet Jane again, thinking it is more important than his job, possibly due to the fact his mother's wanting of a spouse for him. Around this time, it is revealed that the game is narrated by Harry Armis (who also played Jane's father).

When Jane is at the interview, her prospective boss, Paul Mark Thresher (Paul Bokor), tells her that, despite her outstanding qualifications and recommendations, her position was canceled an hour before. When Jane gets very upset about this, Thresher says that "something can be worked out, after all," and asks her to take her clothes off, which appears to be an attempt to lead Jane to have sex with him to get a job. However, when Jane refuses, Thresher attempts to rape her, and eventually, Jane (still partially undressed) runs away from him. John sees Thresher chasing Jane and dashes off to save her. After a long chase sequence through the streets of Los Angeles, the three find themselves in an abandoned building. Around this time, Harry Armis is replaced by a female narrator named Wilma (Thyra Metz). Later, she is shot multiple times by Armis, who then returns as narrator.

After the chase, Thresher offers to pay Jane $5 million for sex. Jane refuses after John confesses his feelings for her. John and Jane both walk out of the house with Thresher having a date with somebody else (Samantha Eggersoll) as a consolation to lose Jane to John, and asking to call the police, while John and Jane return to the parking lot where they first met.

As a reward for being honorable, Jane decides to treat John to dinner and they travel to her place on John's bike. While he attempts to tell her that his profession is that of a plumber, Jane believes he is joking, then replies, "Plumbers don't wear ties."

Bad endings include the following:

 If John doesn't chase after Thresher in the parking lot, Thresher will seduce John, and they two will suddenly become a couple before the game tells the player that they should try again.
 If Jane accepts Thresher's offer of money, John is forced into marrying Amy and having 3 kids to please his mother, and Jane becomes a prostitute.
 If "Gimme Something Completely Different" is selected after Thresher is dealt with, Jane confesses to John that she is still a virgin and plans to become a nun, much to John's surprise. After failing to talk her out of it, John is forced to return home to have dinner with his mother, who arranges a shotgun wedding between him and Amy.

Development
Plumbers Don't Wear Ties was published by Fremont, California-based game company Kirin Entertainment, a subsidiary of Digital Stuff Inc. It was developed and produced by Michael Anderson. The musical score was provided by Martin Golnick and the Audio Micro music production library.

Release
The Windows version of the game was actually released before the 3DO version, but due to a limited number of copies being made it faded into obscurity. In 2017, a user, looking to test an old laptop, discovered the listing for the PC for the game, and after searching through WorldCat, discovered one copy at the Ball State University library. Through Reddit, users were able to obtain the game and made a version emulated through DOSBox for users to try, then later uploaded on the Internet Archive. In comparison to the 3DO version, the Windows version of the game features higher-quality audio than the 3DO version and uncensored cutscenes without the use of a code.

Limited Run Games announced during E3 2021 that they would be porting the game to the Nintendo Switch, PlayStation 4, PlayStation 5 and Microsoft Windows, with both digital and physical releases. It was announced to be released in 2022. 

As of 2023, there have been zero updates on a definitive release date for the title.

Cast
 Edward J. Fasulo as John (credited as Edward J. Foster) 
Jeanne Basone as Jane
Paul Bokor as Thresher
Harry Armis as the Male Narrator and Jane's father
Thyra Metz as Wilma, the Female Narrator
Violetta Gevorkian as John's mother with Samantha Eggersoll providing her voice
Danny Beyda
Giovanni Cuarez
Grant Swanson
Daniel Taylor
Soumaya Young

Reception

Though the game was an obscure title due to the 3DO format, it gained attention through James Rolfe's coverage of it as part of his Angry Video Game Nerd series in 2009.

Plumbers Don't Wear Ties is now widely considered to be one of the worst games of all time. Plumbers Don't Wear Ties received negative attention mainly due to much of the game being presented as a slideshow despite being advertised as a full motion video game (only its introduction was FMV) where it uses mostly still images instead of full motion graphics as well as random, out-of-place color filters. Other criticisms focused on its "surreal" storyline and poor voice acting. It has been also cited as one of the primary reasons for the commercial failure of the 3DO game system.

The critical response to the game was overwhelmingly negative. Criticisms focused on the game's voice acting, controls for making a choice, and for using still frame footage instead of full motion video. In giving the game a meager 15% rating, Diego Antico wrote: "It's hard to determine where Plumbers Don't Wear Ties is at its most horrendous. Is it in the pathetic music department? The graphics (or its lack thereof)? The awful gameplay?" Allgame gave the game one star. The site made note of how despite it being advertised as a full motion video, the game was simply a slideshow. Video Games & Computer Entertainment magazine criticized the game for being all just "still pictures of the director's friends acting like goofballs and delivering bad voiceovers", also stating: "Not even the promise of some naked pictures could save this disc from becoming a joke around here. Avoid this one at all costs, it looks like a bad Public Access show and that's the pits." PC Gamer, giving the game a 3%, said that the game was funny for only 30 seconds, calling the game an "irksome and yobbishly executed pseudo-pornographic photo story with the wit and charm of an elephant's arse". PC Format rated the game a 4%, the lowest rating the magazine had ever given to a video game.

In 1997 Electronic Gaming Monthly listed it as the fourth worst console video game of all time. PC Gamer dubbed Plumbers Don't Wear Ties a "shallow, hateful waste of a game, [that] may very well be responsible for having killed the 3DO, interactive fiction, and the whale", naming it #1 on its "Must NOT Buy" list in May 2007. It was #27 in UGO Network's 102 "Worst Video Games of All Time", concluding "If you have the patience, check out a video walkthrough online of either the worst storyline in gaming history, or a post-modern masterpiece", and #4 in Screen Play's, calling the game a "hilariously dodgy FMV adventure with actors who make Home and Away look like Shakespeare". The game was also put in 411mania.coms 2008 "Hall of Shame", with writer Vincent Chiucchi stating "By Jove, this could very well be the worst game ever!" It was included among the worst games of all time by GamesRadar in 2014.

The game's cover art was one of 1UP.coms "Worst Videogame Box Covers", criticizing its use of clip art and fonts. IGN has cited Plumbers Don't Wear Ties as "a symbol for everything that was wrong with giving a license to anyone that wanted one", referring to the fact that 3DO publishers only needed to pay a $3 royalty per disc and did not have to join a stringent licensing program like other game consoles, which led to many low-quality adult-oriented video games being released for the system.

References

External links
 Plumbers Don't Wear Ties at GameFAQs
 Plumbers Don't Wear Ties at Giant Bomb
 Plumbers Don't Wear Ties at MobyGames

 Plumbers Don't Wear Ties, AVGN Review on YouTube
 Plumbers Don't Wear Ties: Definitive Edition at Metacritic

1993 video games
3DO Interactive Multiplayer games
Adventure games
Articles containing video clips
Erotic video games
PlayStation 4 games
PlayStation 5 games
Nintendo Switch games
Internet memes
North America-exclusive video games
ScummVM-supported games
Single-player video games
Video games developed in the United States
Video games featuring female protagonists
Video games set in Los Angeles
Visual novels
Windows games